Karlo P. Maquinto (born in Lambunao, Iloilo, Philippines on 8 July 1990 - died 3 February 2012) was a super flyweight Filipino boxer who resided in Baguio, Benguet, Philippines. He died after he collapsed at the end of his 7th professional bout.

Early life
Karlo Maquinto was the fifth of six children, their parents are Felicibar Jr. and Marjorie Maquinto. He completed his elementary education, but left high school to pursue his boxing career.

Boxing career
19 January 2011: Win against Andro Oliveros by KO in round 2 of a 4-round bout
11 February 2011: Win against Jhune Cambel by KO in round 3 of a 4-round bout
7 April 2011: Win against Jhune Kambel by KO in round 2 of a 4-round bout
28 May 2011: Win against Jomar Yema by KO in round 3 of a 4-round bout
17 August 2011: Win against Edwin Mondala by points, after a 4-round bout
30 October 2011: Win against Gerald Cortes by points after a 6-round bout
26 November 2011: Win against Zoren Pama by KO in round 3 of a 6-round bout
11 December 2011: Win against Argie Toquero by KO in round 5 of 6-round bout
28 January 2012: Draw with Mark Joseph Costa after an 8-round bout

Death
He collapsed after the end of an 8-round bout with Marc Joseph Costa in Caloocan, Philippines. The match had ended with a majority draw, the sole blemish on an earlier perfect 8-0-0 record with 6 KOs prior.

Maquinto was rushed to FEU Hospital in Quezon City. Karlo was diagnosed with subdural hematoma (blood clot sustained in his brain) upon his admission to the hospital. Tests showed that a blood clot had developed in his brain as a result of blows received in the first round of the fight. As a result, soon Maquinto went into a coma and died 5 days later in the hospital.

References

External links
Box Rec: Karlo Maquinto

1990 births
2012 deaths
Deaths due to injuries sustained in boxing
Sports deaths in the Philippines
Sportspeople from Iloilo
Filipino male boxers
Flyweight boxers